Harry John Hankins (born 24 April 1999) is an English cricketer. He made his first-class debut on 11 April 2019, for Gloucestershire County Cricket Club in the 2019 County Championship.

References

External links
 

1999 births
Living people
English cricketers
Gloucestershire cricketers
Sportspeople from Bath, Somerset
English cricketers of the 21st century